Hawaii Five-O (with a capital letter "O" as the last character in the title) is an American police procedural drama series produced by CBS Productions and created by Leonard Freeman (not to be confused with Hawaii Five-0, with a numeral zero as the last character in the title). Set in Hawaii, the show originally aired for 12 seasons on CBS from September 20, 1968, to April 8, 1980, and continues in reruns. At the airing of its last episode, it was the longest-running police drama in American television history and the last scripted primetime show that debuted in the 1960s to leave the air.

The show starred Jack Lord as Detective Captain Stephen "Steve" McGarrett, the head of a fictional state police task force in Hawaii. The theme music composed by Morton Stevens became especially popular. Many episodes in the series would end with McGarrett's catchphrase, "Book 'em!"

Overview
The CBS television network produced Hawaii Five-O, which aired from September 20, 1968, to April 5, 1980. The program continues to be broadcast in syndication worldwide. Created by Leonard Freeman, Hawaii Five-O was shot on location in Honolulu, Hawaii, and throughout the island of Oahu and other Hawaiian islands with occasional filming in locales such as Los Angeles, Singapore, and Hong Kong.

The show centers on a fictional state police force led by former US naval officer Steve McGarrett (played by Jack Lord), a detective captain, who is appointed by the Governor, Paul Jameson. In the show, McGarrett oversees state police officers – the young Danny "Danno" Williams, veteran Chin Ho Kelly, and streetwise Kono Kalakaua for seasons one through four. Honolulu Police Department Officer Duke Lukela joined the team as a regular, as did Ben Kokua, who replaced Kono beginning with season five. Occasionally, McGarrett's Five-O team is assisted by other officers as needed: Det. Frank Kamana (Douglas Mossman), P.O. Sandi Wells (Amanda McBroom), medical examiner Doc Bergman (Al Eben), forensic specialist Che Fong (Harry Endo), and a secretary. The first secretary was May, then Jenny, and later Malia, Lani and Luana.

The title of the show refers to Hawaii's status as the 50th US state; at the time of its premiere, Hawaii had officially been a U.S. state for only nine years. The Five-O team consists of three to five members (small for a real state police unit), and is portrayed as occupying a suite of offices in the Iolani Palace. Five-O lacks its own radio network, necessitating frequent requests by McGarrett to the Honolulu Police Department dispatchers.

For 12 seasons, McGarrett and his team pursued international secret agents, criminals, and organized crime syndicates plaguing the Hawaiian Islands. With the aid of District Attorney and later Hawaii's Attorney General John Manicote, McGarrett is successful in sending most of his enemies to prison. One such crime syndicate was led by crime family patriarch Honore Vashon, a character introduced in the fifth season. Other criminals and organized crime bosses on the islands were played by actors such as Ricardo Montalbán, Gavin MacLeod, and Ross Martin as Tony Alika.

By the 12th and final season, series regular James MacArthur had left the show (in 1996, he admitted that he had become tired of the role and wanted to do other things), as had Kam Fong. Unlike other characters before him, Fong's character, Chin Ho Kelly, at Fong's request, was killed off, murdered while working undercover to expose a protection ring in Chinatown in the last episode of season 10. New characters Jim 'Kimo' Carew (William Smith), Lori Wilson (Sharon Farrell), and Truck (Moe Keale) were introduced in season 12 alongside returning regular character Duke Lukela.

Most episodes of Hawaii Five-O ended with the arrest of criminals and McGarrett snapping, "Book 'em." The offense occasionally was added after this phrase, for example, "Book 'em, murder one." In many episodes, this was directed to Danny "Danno" Williams and became McGarrett's catchphrase: "Book 'em, Danno." This catchphrase also expanded to sports in the mid-1970s with former Pittsburgh Penguins announcer Mike Lange, who would utter the line for some Penguins goals.

McGarrett's tousled yet immaculate hairstyle, as well as his proclivity for wearing a dark suit and tie on all possible occasions (uncommon in the islands), rapidly entered popular culture. While the other members of Five-O "dressed mainland" much of the time, they also often wore local styles, such as the ubiquitous Aloha shirt.

In many episodes (including the pilot), McGarrett is drawn into the world of international espionage and national intelligence. McGarrett's nemesis is a rogue intelligence officer of the People's Republic of China named Wo Fat. The communist rogue agent was played by veteran actor Khigh Dhiegh. In the show's final episode in 1980, titled "Woe to Wo Fat", McGarrett finally sees his foe go to jail.

Unlike the reboot the show's action and straightforward storytelling left little time for personal stories involving wives or girlfriends, though a two-part story in the first season dealt with the loss of McGarrett's sister's baby. Occasionally, a show would flash back to McGarrett's younger years or to a romantic figure.

In the episode "Number One with a Bullet, Part 2", McGarrett tells a criminal, "It was a bastard like you who killed my father." His 42-year-old father had been run down and killed by someone who had just held up a supermarket. Because Steve McGarrett is also a commander in the Naval Reserve, he sometimes uses their resources to help investigate and solve crimes. Hence the closing credits of some episodes mentioned the Naval Reserve. A 1975 episode involving Danno's aunt, played by MacArthur's mother Helen Hayes, provided a bit of Williams' back story.

Creation of the show
Sources differ on how the show came to be. Producer Leonard Freeman moved to Hawaii to recuperate after suffering a heart attack. One source states the idea for the show may have come from a conversation Freeman had with Hawaii's then-Governor John A. Burns.

Another source instead claims that Freeman wanted to set a show in San Pedro, Los Angeles, California until his friend Richard Boone convinced him to shoot it entirely in Hawaii. A third source claims Freeman discussed the show with Governor Burns only after pitching the idea to CBS. Before settling on the name "Hawaii Five-O", Freeman considered titling the show "The Man".

Casting

Freeman offered Richard Boone the part of McGarrett, but Boone turned it down; Gregory Peck and Robert Brown were also considered. Ultimately, Jack Lord – then living in Beverly Hills – was asked at the last moment. Lord read for the part on a Wednesday, was cast, and flew to Hawaii two days later. On the following Monday, Lord was in front of the cameras. Freeman and Lord had worked together previously on an unsold TV pilot called Grand Hotel.

Tim O'Kelly originated the role of Danny "Danno" Williams in the pilot episode, "Cocoon". Test audiences apparently were not positive on O'Kelly, however, and the producers replaced him with James MacArthur.

Kam Fong Chun, an 18-year veteran of the Honolulu Police Department, auditioned for the part of the lead villain Wo Fat, but Freeman cast him in the part of Chin Ho Kelly instead. Freeman took the name Wo Fat from a restaurant in downtown Honolulu. The name Chin Ho came from Chinn Ho, the owner of the Ilikai Hotel where the penthouse shot of Steve McGarrett in the opening title sequence was taken. Richard Denning, who played the governor, had retired to Hawaii and came out of retirement for the show. Zulu was a Waikiki beach boy and local DJ with no acting experience when he was cast for the part of Kono, which he played for the next four years.

Characters

Recurring
 Wo Fat (Khigh Dhiegh), a Chinese intelligence agent and criminal mastermind
 Che Fong (Edward Tom (season 1), Danny Kamekona (seasons 1–2), Harry Endo (seasons 2–10)), the HPD forensic specialist
 Joey Lee (Brian Tochi), former gang leader turned undercover informant for McGarrett 
 Doc Bergman (Al Eben), the medical examiner 
 Lieutenant George Kealoha (Douglas Mossman), HPD (season 1) 
 Jonathan Kaye (James Gregory (pilot), Joseph Sirola (season 2–5), Robert Dixon ("To Kill or Be Killed," season 3), Tim O'Connor ("The Ninety-Second War," season 4), Bill Edwards (seasons 5–10), and Lyle Bettger (season 10)), from the U. S. State Department
 "Doc" (full name never used) (Newell Tarrant (season 1), Robert Brilliande (season 2), Ted Thorpe (season 2), Robert Costa (season 3)), HPD medical examiner (or coroner)
 Attorney General Walter Stewart (Morgan White; season 1)
 May (Mitzi Hoag (pilot), Maggi Parker), McGarrett's secretary (season 1)
 Jenny Sherman (Peggy Ryan), McGarrett's secretary (seasons 2–8)
 Luana (Laura Sode), McGarrett's secretary (seasons 11–12)
 Dr. Grant Ormsbee (Pat Hingle), a scientist (seasons 8 & 9)
 Dr. Bishop (Jean Tarrant), criminal psychologist (season 6). Tarrant also guest starred in two non-recurring character roles, one in season 8 and one in season 9.

Pilot cast
 Danny "Danno" Williams, Detective Sgt. – Tim O'Kelly
 Paul Jameson, Governor – Lew Ayres
 May, secretary – Mitzi Hoag

Production
The first season was shot in a rusty military Quonset hut in Pearl City, which the various cast members quickly nicknamed "Mongoose Manor". The roof tended to leak, and rats would often gnaw at the cables. The show then moved to a Fort Ruger location for seasons two to eight. A third studio was built at Diamond Head, and was used during the last four seasons.

A problem from the beginning was the lack of a movie industry in Hawaii. Much of the crew and cast, including many locals who ended up participating in the show, had to learn their respective jobs as they went along. Jack Lord was known as a perfectionist who insisted on the best from everyone. His temper flared when he felt that others did not give their best, but in later reunions they admitted that Lord's hard-driving force had made them better actors and made Hawaii Five-O a better show. Lord's high standards helped the show last another six years after Leonard Freeman's death from heart trouble during the sixth season.

To critics and viewers, there was no question that Jack Lord was the center of the show, and that the other actors frequently served as little more than props, standing and watching while McGarrett emoted and paced around his office, analyzing the crime. But occasionally episodes would focus on the other actors, and let them showcase their own talents, such as Danno defusing bombs in "The Clock Struck Twelve". Since Jack Lord had a financial interest in the show, he referred to other regular cast actors in the program as a "with", as in "With James MacArthur"; they were never called "co-stars".

Very few episodes were shot outside of Hawaii. At least two episodes were shot in Los Angeles, one in Hong Kong, and one in Singapore.

Credits
The opening title sequence was created by television director Reza S. Badiyi. Early shows began with a cold open suggesting the sinister plot for that episode, then cut to a shot of a big ocean wave and the start of the theme song. A fast zoom-in to the top balcony of the Ilikai Hotel followed, showing McGarrett turning to face the camera, followed by many quick-cuts and freeze-frames of Hawaiian scenery, and Hawaiian-Chinese-English model Elizabeth Malamalamaokalani Logue turning to face the camera. A grass-skirted hula dancer from the pilot episode was also included, played by Helen Kuoha-Torco, who later became a business professor at Windward Community College. The opening scene ended with shots of the supporting players, and the flashing blue light of a police motorcycle racing through a Honolulu street.

At the conclusion of each episode, Jack Lord narrated a promo for the next episode, often emphasizing the "guest villain", especially if the villain is a recurring character, such as that played by actor Hume Cronyn (2 episodes).  The line he spoke was, "This is Jack Lord inviting you to be with us next week for <name of episode>" and then, "Be here. Aloha." The promos were removed from the syndicated episodes but most have been restored in DVD releases from the second season through the ninth. Most of the promos are slightly edited to remove references to "next week".

This tradition has been continued in the 2010 version of Hawaii Five-0, but is not limited to Alex O'Loughlin. All of the primary cast members take turns with the "Be here. Aloha" line at the end of the preview segment.

There were two versions of the closing credits portion of the show. During the first season, the theme music was played over a short film of a flashing blue light attached to the rear of a police motorcycle in Waikiki heading west (the film is shown at twice the normal speed, as can be seen from people crossing a street behind the police motorcycle). In later seasons, the same music was played over film of outrigger canoeists battling the surf.

In a 2010 issue of TV Guide, the show's opening title sequence ranked No. 4 on a list of TV's top 10 credits sequences, as selected by readers.

Legacy
The show was the longest-running crime show on American television until Law & Order surpassed it in 2002, and was the first to enjoy an uninterrupted run that exceeded a decade (it has since been joined in that distinction by several other series including Law & Order: Special Victims Unit, CSI: Crime Scene Investigation and NCIS).

When the show premiered in 1968 Hawaii had been a state for only nine years and was relatively obscure to Americans who had never served in the Pacific Theater, but as a geographic part of Polynesia it had an exotic image.

Known for the location, theme song, and ensemble cast, Hawaii Five-O contains a heavy use of exterior location shooting throughout the entire 12 seasons. A typical episode, on average, would have at least two-thirds of all footage shot on location, as opposed to a "typical" show of the time which would be shot largely on sound stages and backlots. It is also remembered for its unusual setting during a time when most crime dramas of the era were set in or around the Los Angeles or New York City areas.

The Hawaii-based television show Magnum, P.I. was created after Hawaii Five-O ended its run, in order to make further use of the expensive production facilities created there for Five-O. The first few Magnum P.I. episodes made direct references to Five-O, suggesting that it takes place in the same fictional setting. Magnums producers made a few attempts to coax Jack Lord out of retirement for a cameo appearance, but he refused.

Many local people were cast in the show, which was ethnically diverse by the standards of the late 1960s. The first run and syndication were seen by an estimated 400 million people around the world.

"Bored, She Hung Herself", the 16th episode of the second season, depicted a Five-O investigation into the apparent suicide of a woman by hanging, which she was supposedly practicing as part of a health regimen. A viewer reportedly died trying the same technique, and as a result, the episode was not rebroadcast, was never included in any syndication packages, and has not been included on any DVD release of the show to date. The family of the person who died in the real-life hanging sued CBS over the episode.

Remake projects
A one-hour pilot for a new series was made in 1996 but never aired. Produced and written by Stephen J. Cannell, it starred Gary Busey and Russell Wong as the new Five-O team. James MacArthur returned as Dan Williams, having become governor of Hawaii. Several cameos were made by other Five-O regulars, including Kam Fong as Chin Ho Kelly (even though the character had been killed off at the end of Season 10).

A remake pilot, called Hawaii Five-0 (the last character is a zero instead of the letter "O", which is the true title of the original series as well), aired September 20, 2010, on CBS. It lasted for 10 seasons until the 240th and final episode was aired on April 3, 2020. The remake version Hawaii Five-0 used the same principal character names as the original, and the new Steve McGarrett's late father's vintage 1974 Mercury Marquis was the actual car driven by Lord in the original series's final seasons. The new series opening credit sequence was an homage to the original; the theme song was cut in half, from 60 to 30 seconds, but was an otherwise identical instrumentation. Most of the iconic shots were replicated, beginning with the helicopter approach and close-up turn of McGarrett at the Ilikai Hotel penthouse, the jet engine nacelle, a hula dancer's hips, the quickly stepped zoom-in to the face of the Lady Columbia statue at Punchbowl, the close-up of the Kamehameha Statue's face, and the ending with a police motorcycle's flashing blue light. The surname of recurring character Governor Sam Denning (played by Richard T. Jones) was a nod to actor Richard Denning, who played the Governor in the original series. Starting with the Season 7 many of the clips that were part of the original opening were removed and more action shots of the cast were included. On the March 19, 2012, episode, Ed Asner reprised his role as "August March", a character he first played in a 1975 episode. Clips from the 1975 episode were included in the new one, even though the 2010 series was intended to be in a different narrative universe than the Jack Lord series. The 2016 episode "Makaukau 'oe e Pa'ani?" features a sequence in which McGarrett (played by Alex O'Loughlin) briefly interacts with a CGI reconstruction of Jack Lord.

Theme music

Another legacy of the show is the popularity of the Hawaii Five-O theme music. The tune was composed by Morton Stevens, who also composed numerous episode scores performed by the CBS Orchestra. The theme was later recorded by the Ventures, whose version reached No. 4 on the Billboard Hot 100 pop chart, and is particularly popular with college and high school marching bands, especially at the University of Hawaii where it has become the unofficial fight song. The tune has also been heard at Robertson Stadium after Houston Dynamo goals scored by Brian Ching, a native of Hawaii.  Because of the tempo of the music, the theme gained popularity in the UK with followers of Northern soul and was popular on dance floors in the 1970s.

Slang term for police
The phrase "five-O" (or any variation, such as "5–0", "5-O", and "five O")  ) has often come to refer to the police in the United States.

Episodes

Broadcast history
 September 1968 – December 1968: Thursdays at 8:00 p.m.
 December 1968 – March 1971: Wednesdays at 10:00 p.m.
 September 1971 – February 1974: Tuesdays at 8:30 p.m.
 September 1974 – March 1975: Tuesdays at 9:00 p.m.
 September 1975 – November 1975: Fridays at 9:00 p.m.
 December 1975 – November 1979: Thursdays at 9:00 p.m.
 December 1979 – January 1980: Tuesdays at 9:00 p.m.
 March 1980 – April 1980: Saturdays at 9:00 p.m.

Syndication
Hawaii Five-O survived long enough to overlap with reruns of early episodes, which were broadcast by CBS in their late night schedule while new episodes were still being produced. Once the program entered syndication after the original run of the series, CBS broadcast reruns of season 12 in late night under the title McGarrett to avoid confusion with the episodes in syndication broadcast under the title Hawaii Five-O. 
In the United Kingdom, the series first aired on ITV on July 19, 1970, in a Saturday evening time slot.
As of 2021, the series currently airs in Ontario, Canada weekdays at 1pm on CHCH TV 11. CHCH airs the HD remastered version of the series in its original unedited broadcast versions.

In Hawaii, the series aired on 13 Alanui beginning on August 1, 2001, the day 13 Alanui was released until December 30, 2011.

Awards and nominations

Emmys
Wins
1970: Outstanding Music Composition - For a Series or a Single Program of a Series (In Its First Year Only): Morton Stevens, "A Thousand Pardons, You're Dead!"
1974: Best Music Composition - For a Series, a Single Program of a Series : Morton Stevens, "Hookman"
Nominations
1969: Outstanding Cinematography: Frank Phillips, "Up-Tight"
1969: Outstanding Musical Composition: Morton Stevens, the pilot
1971: Outstanding Film Editing: Arthur David Hilton, "Over Fifty? Steal"
1971: Outstanding Directing: Bob Sweeney, "Over Fifty? Steal"
1972: Outstanding Cinematography: Robert L. Morrison
1973: Outstanding Drama Series: Leonard Freeman, executive producer; Bob Sweeney, supervising producer; William Finnegan, producer
1974: Best Cinematography: Robert Morrison, Jack Whitman and Bill Huffman
1974: Best Music Composition – Series: Don B. Ray, "Nightmare in Blue"
1974: Best Music Composition – Series: Bruce Broughton, "The $100,000 Nickel"
1976: Outstanding Actress, Single Performance Drama or Comedy Series: Helen Hayes, "Retire in Sunny Hawaii ... Forever"

Streaming media
CBS Interactive had presented the entire first season of the show online via Adobe Flash streaming media.
As of July 2017, almost every episode is available at CBS.com.
The first 10 episodes of season 1 are available free of charge. All other episodes require a CBS All Access subscription to view.

Home media
CBS DVD (distributed by Paramount) has released all twelve seasons on DVD in Region 1. The first eight seasons have been released in region 2 and the first seven seasons in region 4.

In September 2019 (Region 4, Australia), Via Vision Entertainment released a Season 1-7 Boxset followed by Season 8-12 Boxset in February 2020. The Via Vision Entertainment releases are only available in these box sets and not individual seasons.

The episode "Bored, She Hung Herself" is not included in The Second Season set. The omission is mentioned on the back of the box. Only some Australian bootlegs have had the episode. Seasons 2–8 contain episode promos by Jack Lord.

On December 3, 2013, Paramount released Hawaii Five-O – The Complete Series on DVD in Region 1. On April 18, 2017, The Complete Series set was reissued.

Other media
A soundtrack album featuring Morton Stevens' theme and incidental music from the pilot and the first two seasons was issued by Capitol Records in 1970. Unlike many albums of television music of the time, the music was taken directly from the scoring sessions rather than being specially re-recorded for album release. One of the instrumental pieces on the album, "Call to Danger", was originally recorded for the unsold 1967 pilot of the same name and also excerpted as background music accompanying a "Special Presentation" logo that CBS used to introduce its prime time television specials throughout the 1970s and 1980s. The album was re-issued on compact disc by Film Score Monthly in 2010.

 "Hawaii Five-0" (1:32)
 "Call to Danger" (1:48)
 "McGarrett's Theme" (2:25)
 "Front Street" (2:42)
 "The Long Wait" (2:18)
 "Blues Trip" (3:14)
 "The Floater" (2:23)
 "Interlude" (1:53)
 "Operation Smash" (2:05)
 "Beach Trip" (2:30)
 "Up Tight" (2:05)
 "The Chase/Hawaii Five-0" (4:36)

Hawaii Five-O was the subject of six original novels. The first two books were published by Signet Paperbacks in 1968 and 1969. After that were two juvenile hard covers published by Whitman publishing in 1969 and 1971 and finally two more books were published in England.

See also

References

External links

 Hawaii Five-O Home Page
 
 
 
 Hawaii Five-O selected First Season episodes at cbs.com
 Hawaii Five-O Episode Guide at TV Favourites
 Jack Lord and Hawaii Five-0 Website
 The Hawaii Five-O FAQ (Frequently Asked Questions)

 
1968 American television series debuts
1970s American crime drama television series
1970s American police procedural television series
1970s American television series
1980 American television series endings
1980s American crime drama television series
1980s American police procedural television series
American action television series
American detective television series
CBS original programming
English-language television shows
Fictional law enforcement agencies
Fictional portrayals of the Honolulu Police Department
Television shows adapted into novels
Television series by CBS Studios
Television shows filmed in Hawaii
Television shows set in Hawaii